Bis-TOM (4-methyl-2,5-dimethylthio-alpha-methylphenethylamine) is a substituted amphetamine. It is an analog of DOM. Bis-TOM was first synthesized by Alexander Shulgin. In his book PiHKAL, the minimum dosage is listed as 160 mg, and the duration unknown. Bis-TOM produces no psychoactive effects. Very little data exists about the pharmacological properties, metabolism, and toxicity of Bis-TOM.

See also 
 Phenethylamine
 Psychedelics, dissociatives and deliriants

References

Thioethers
Substituted amphetamines